The 1946 Arizona gubernatorial election took place on November 5, 1946. Incumbent Governor Sidney Preston Osborn ran for reelection, easily winning the Democratic primary, as well as defeating Republican challenger Bruce Brockett in the general election, and was sworn into his fourth term as Governor on January 7, 1947. Osborn died in office a year later.

In comparison to previous election cycles, Brockett signaled a shift in voters becoming more Republican, outperforming their past electoral failures significantly.

Democratic primary

Candidates
 Sidney P. Osborn, former Secretary of State of Arizona
 Howard Sprouse, state legislator

Results

Republican primary

Candidates
 Bruce Brockett, cattleman

General election

References

1946
1946 United States gubernatorial elections
Gubernatorial
November 1946 events in the United States